Oulton  may refer to:

Places
Oulton, Cumbria, England
Oulton, Norfolk, England
Oulton, Norbury, in Norbury, Staffordshire, England
Oulton, Stone Rural, Staffordshire, England
Oulton, Suffolk, England
Oulton, West Yorkshire, England
Oulton Dyke, Suffolk, England

Persons
Brian Oulton (1908–1992), English character actor
Derek Oulton (1927–2016), British senior civil servant
Michael Oulton (born 1959), Anglican Bishop of Ontario
Thérèse Oulton (born 1953), English painter
Walley Chamberlain Oulton (1770?–1820?), Irish playwright and theatre historian
Wilfrid Oulton (1911-1997), RAF officer

See also
Oulton Broad North railway station, Suffolk
Oulton Broad South railway station, Suffolk
Oulton College, Canadian private post secondary college situated in Moncton, New Brunswick
Oulton Estate, former house and grounds in Cheshire - containing
Oulton Park, Motor racing circuit
Oulton Hall, West Yorkshire
Oulton Park, motor racing track in Little Budworth, Cheshire
Oulton Raiders, amateur rugby league football club from Oulton in Leeds, West Yorkshire
Oulton Raidettes, English women's Rugby League club
RAF Oulton, Norfolk
Timothy Oulton, British furniture brand named after its founder and creative director Timothy Oulton